The Lauder family is an American billionnaire family. It owes its initial fame to Estée Lauder (1908–2004), who with her husband Joseph H. Lauder, made a fortune via her eponymous cosmetics business, Estée Lauder Companies, during the 20th century.

The family is of Hungarian Jewish and Czech Jewish ancestry.

As of December 2022 the family net worth is estimated at $33 billion.

Family tree

Lauder 
Some of the family members include:
Please note capitalization of surnames is typically used in genealogy trees

  William LAUTER. Married to Lillian.
 Joseph H. LAUDER (né LAUTER). Born: 26 Dec 1902. Married: 15 Jan 1930. Divorced: 11 Apr 1939. Remarried: 7 Dec 1942. Died: Jan 1983. Married to Josephine Esther "Estée" MENTZER. Born: 1 Jul 1908, Corona, Queens. Died: 24 Apr 2004.
 Leonard A. LAUDER. Born: 19 Mar 1933. Married: 1959. Married to Evelyn H. HAUSNER. Born: 12 Aug 1936, Vienna, Austria. Died: 12 Nov 2011, New York, New York. Married: 1 Jan 2015. Married to Judy GLICKMAN.
 Gary M. LAUDER. Married to Laura HELLER.
 Josh LAUDER. Married Katherine CHAN.
 Eliana LAUDER
 William P. LAUDER. Born: 11 Apr 1960. Married to Karen JACOBS.
 Rachel LAUDER
 Danielle LAUDER
 daughter LAUDER
 Ronald S. LAUDER. Born: 26 Feb 1944, New York, New York. Married to Jo Carole KNOPF.
 Aerin R. LAUDER. Born: 23 Apr 1970. Married: 1 Jun 1996. Married to Eric ZINTERHOFER.
 Jack ZINTERHOFER
 Will ZINTERHOFER
 Jane LAUDER. Born 1973. Married to Kevin WARSH.

Mentzer 
Some of the family members include:
Please note capitalization of surnames is typically used in genealogy trees

 Max MENTZER. Married to Rose SCHOTZ. (Born: abt 1837/1897. Married Abraham ROSENTHAL (first husband))
 Sylvan Schwartzreich born 1908 (grandson of Rose, son of deceased Rose's daughter Bertha. Bertha, and unborn child, died in 1913. Sylvan raised by Rose due to death of mother, Bertha. 
 Helen Schwartzreich born 1910 (granddaughter of Rose, daughter of Rose's daughter Bertha.  Helen raised by Rose due to death of mother, Bertha.  
 Grace "Renee" MENTZER.
 Josephine Esther "Estée" MENTZER. Born: 1 JuL 1906, Corona, Queens. Married: 1930. Divorced: 11 Apr 1939. Remarried: 7 Dec 1942. Died: 24 Apr 2004. Married to Joseph H. LAUDER(né LAUTER).(Born: 26 Dec 1902. Died: Jan 1983.)

Further reading

Estée Lauder 
 Lauder, Estée. Estée: A Success Story. New York: Random House, 1985.  
 Epstein, Rachel S. Estée Lauder: Beauty Business Success. New York: Franklin Watts, 2000.  
 Koehn, Nancy F. Brand New: How Entrepreneurs Earned Consumers' Trust from Wedgwood to Dell. Boston: Harvard Business School Press, 2001.   "Part 2. The Present. Chapter 5. Estée Lauder." pp. 137–200.

Ronald S. Lauder 
 Lauder, Ronald S. "Discovering Klimt." Lauder, Ronald S., Renée Price, and Gustav Klimt. Gustav Klimt: The Ronald S. Lauder and Serge Sabarsky Collections. New York: Neue Galerie New York, 2007.   Published in conjunction with the exhibition held Oct. 18, 2007-June 30, 2008, at the Neue Galerie New York.

References 

 
Business families
American businesspeople
Jewish-American families